The Archdeacons in the Diocese of Chelmsford are senior ecclesiastical officers in the Church of England in Essex and East London. They currently include: the Archdeacon of West Ham, the Archdeacon of Colchester and the archdeacons of Chelmsford, of Harlow, of Barking, of Stansted and of Southend. Each one has responsibility over a geographical area within the diocese.

History
When the diocese was created, it consisted of the ancient archdeaconries of Essex and Colchester. The first changes to the diocese's archdeaconries occurred on 17 March 1922 when the Archdeaconry of Southend was created from the old Essex archdeaconry and that old archdeaconry renamed to West Ham: at its erection, the 1922 Southend archdeaconry consisted of the Deaneries of Barstable/Brentwood, of Canewdon and Southend, of Chelmsford, of Chigwell, of Dengie, of Harlow, of Maldon, of Ongar, of Roding, and of Wickford. West Ham archdeaconry was further split in 1993 to create the Archdeaconry of Harlow following a 1989 decision of the Diocesan Synod.

As part of Stephen Cottrell's vision for the diocese's long-term future, consultations occurred on proposals to create three new archdeaconries. On 1 February 2013, by Pastoral Order of the Bishop of Chelmsford, the three archdeaconries were created: the new Archdeaconry of Stansted from Colchester archdeaconry, a new Archdeaconry of Barking from West Ham archdeaconry and a new Archdeaconry of Southend created from Southend archdeaconry after it had been renamed the Archdeaconry of Chelmsford. Initially, the Archdeacons of Colchester, of West Ham, and of Chelmsford were also Acting Archdeacons of Stansted, of Barking, and of Southend respectively.

List of archdeacons

Archdeacons of Essex and of West Ham

2007–present: Elwin Cockett

Archdeacons of Colchester

2010–present: Ruth Patten

Archdeacons of Southend (before 2013) and of Chelmsford
Archdeacons of Southend
1922–1937 (ret.): Percy Bayne (afterwards archdeacon emeritus)
1938–1953 (ret.): Ellis Gowing (afterwards archdeacon emeritus)
1953–1972 (ret.): Neville Welch (also Bishop suffragan of Bradwell from 1968)
1972–1977 (res.): Peter Bridges
1977–1982 (res.): John Moses
1982–1992 (res.): Jonathan Bailey
1992–2000 (res.): David Jennings
20011 February 2013 (renamed): David Lowman

Archdeacons of Chelmsford
1 February 201331 January 2016 (ret.): David Lowman
13 March 2016October 2022 (ret): Elizabeth Snowden (retired on or after 2 October 2022)

Archdeacons of Harlow
1993–1996 (res.): Michael Fox
1996–2009 (ret.): Peter Taylor
200931 March 2017 (ret.): Martin Webster
24 September 2017present: Vanessa Herrick

Archdeacons of Barking
1 February15 September 2013: Elwin Cockett, Archdeacon of West Ham (Acting)
15 September 20133 July 2018: John Perumbalath (became area Bishop of Bradwell)
12 May 2019present: Chris Burke

Archdeacons of Stansted
1 February15 September 2013: Annette Cooper, Archdeacon of Colchester (Acting)
15 September 2013present: Robin King

Archdeacons of Southend (since 2013)
1 February15 September 2013: David Lowman, Archdeacon of Chelmsford (Acting)
15 September 201331 December 2016 (ret.): Mina Smallman
19 March 2017November 2021 (ret.): Mike Lodge (Acting since 1 August 2016)
26 June 2022present: Mike Power (Acting since November 2021)

References

 
Lists of Anglicans
 
 
 
 
 
Archdeacons in the Diocese of Chelmsford
Lists of English people